The U Sports Defenceman of the Year is the annual award presented to the U Sports men's ice hockey player who is judged by a committee of the U Sports Men’s Hockey Coaches Association to be the most outstanding defenceman in U Sports.

Winners
2009-10: Marc-Andre Dorion (McGill Redmen)
2010-11: Andrew Hotham (Saint Mary's Huskies)
2011-12: Marc-Andre Dorion (McGill Redmen)
2012-13: Pierre-Luc Lessard (UQTR Patriotes)
2013-14: Ryan McKiernan (McGill Redmen)
2014-15: Jesse Craige (Alberta Golden Bears)
2015-16: Jordan Murray (UNB Varsity Reds)
2016-17: Jordan Murray (UNB Varsity Reds)

References

U Sports ice hockey trophies and awards